Anthon is a surname. It derived from the Antonius root name. Notable people with the surname include:

Charles Anthon (1797–1867), American classical scholar
Georg David Anthon (1714 – 1781), Danish architect
John Anthon (1784-1863), American jurist
Kelly Anthon (born 1974), American politician

See also

Anthoni, name
Antoon